Yasmin Bannerman (born 1970) is an English actress. Bannerman was born and brought up in Gloucestershire and attended the Rose Bruford College in London until 1993. She has had roles in television series such as Hollyoaks, Cold Feet, Merseybeat and Doctor Who, and in the films Maybe Baby and Killing Me Softly.

Background 
Yasmin Bannerman was born and brought up in Gloucester, where she attended St Peter's Roman Catholic School. She spent time acting there and later joined the Everyman Youth Theatre in Cheltenham before beginning a degree in modern European literature at the University of Reading. She dropped out after a year to attend the Rose Bruford College in London, graduating in 1993.

Career 
Her first television role came in 1995 when she appeared in an episode of Crown Prosecutor. Shortly afterwards she was cast as Maddie Parker in Channel 4's soap opera Hollyoaks. She describes her role in the soap as "demanding", though the character appeared less frequently as time went on. Further appearances include a brief role in Red Dwarf and a recurring role in the third series of Cold Feet as Jessica Barnes, a local political activist who has an affair with David Marsden (played by Robert Bathurst).

In the same year she appeared in Ben Elton's Maybe Baby as Melinda. Further appearances include roles in Queen of Swords, In Deep, Holby City, Life on Mars, and an eight-episode stint in Merseybeat. In 2005 she played Jabe (an alien that resembles a tree) in the second episode of BBC Wales' revival of Doctor Who. Her audition was "shrouded in secrecy" and the part required a lengthy make-up process; the prosthetics took three hours to apply and 90 minutes to remove. Further involvement in the Doctor Who franchise includes guest roles in the audio dramas The Bride of Peladon and The Fourth Wall, and a part in the Torchwood episode "They Keep Killing Suzie".

In 2015, she played Roz Forrester, a companion of the Seventh Doctor, in three novel adaptations of the Virgin New and Missing Adventures, Damaged Goods, Original Sin and Cold Fusion. These stories were adapted by Big Finish Productions. She later reprised the role in a series of four stories released in November 2018, entitled "The Seventh Doctor: The New Adventures".

In 2017, Bannerman is playing Dayna Mellanby, a character in the Blake's 7 audio adventure series by Big Finish Productions. Bannerman is the third actress to play Dayna following Josette Simon in the television series and Angela Bruce in the BBC Radio series.

Filmography

References

External links
 

1972 births
People educated at St Peter's High School, Gloucester
Alumni of Rose Bruford College
Black British actresses
English film actresses
English television actresses
Living people
Actresses from Gloucestershire
People from Gloucester
20th-century English actresses
21st-century English actresses